Adi Ran (born 1961 in Ramat Gan) is an Israeli singer, musician, lyricist and composer who innovated a new music genre called Hasidic Underground (also known as Alternative Hasidic). He is a Na Nach Breslover. He has been called "The Bruce Springsteen of religious music".

Biography
Ran began his musical career as coordinator in the Ramat Gan tribe of the Israel Boy and Girl Scouts Federation. Later, he attracted a loyal group of fans after starting to perform in Tel Aviv pubs on the local underground music scene.

In 1993, Ran became a baal teshuva and continued his music career heavily influenced spiritually by Breslov Hasidism in the new genre that he perhaps created and which he remains unique, Hasidic Underground.

Ushpizin soundtrack
He rose to fame after the 2005 release of the film Ushpizin, whose soundtrack featured two of his older songs, "Atah Kadosh" and "Yesh Rak HaKadosh Baruch Hu".

As the title indicates, the Unplugged album is a 2-disc set of acoustic renderings of many of the songs from his studio recordings, performed in an often boisterous and exuberant manner, including a live version of "Atah Kadosh."

There is also a concert DVD of Adi Ran performing in Tsfat.

Influences
His music is influenced by Israeli singers Meir Ariel, Arik Einstein, and Shalom Hanoch, and foreign acts like Bob Dylan, Led Zeppelin, TRex, and Pink Floyd. Adi Ran's music has frequent references to Breslov concepts.

He has recently been featured occasionally on Rabbi Lazer Brody's blog, "Lazer Beams," and travelled to Uman with Brody for Rosh Hashanah 2008.

Discography
 1998 – HaAharon SheBaAm, האחרון שבעם
 2001 – Al Take BaSela, אל תכה בסלע
 2004 – Ma Yesh Lakhem Lid'og, מה יש לכם לדאוג
 2006 – Adi Ran Unplugged, עדי רן והגיטרה – אלבום אנפלאגד
 2007 – Adi Ran and Srulik Herschtik, עדי רן ושרוליק הרשטיק
 2007 – Live, בהופעה חיה
 2009 – Hitbonenut, התבוננות

References

External links
 Ushpizin Movie Clip – Ata Kadosh
 Interview on Breslovworld.com
 

1961 births
Living people
Baalei teshuva
Breslov Hasidim
Hasidic entertainers
20th-century Israeli male singers
Israeli Orthodox Jews
Israeli rock singers
Jewish Israeli musicians
People from Ramat Gan
Israeli film score composers
Jewish rock
Male film score composers
21st-century Israeli male singers